France competed at the 1906 Intercalated Games in Athens, Greece. 56 athletes, 55 men and 1 woman, competed in 51 events in 11 sports.

Athletics

Track

Field

Cycling

Fencing

Gymnastics

Rowing

Shooting

Swimming

Tennis

Weightlifting

Wrestling

Greco-Roman

References

Nations at the 1906 Intercalated Games
1906
Intercalated Games